The War Lake First Nation is a First Nations community located within the boundaries of Ilford, Manitoba. Its members are residents of the Mooseocoot Indian Reserve.

References

External links 
Keewatin Tribal Council - War Lake First Nation 

Keewatin Tribal Council
First Nations governments in Manitoba
First Nations in Northern Region, Manitoba